Jaaron Romero Simmons (born April 8, 1995) is an American former professional basketball player. He was a standout player at Archbishop Alter High School in Kettering, Ohio, leaving as its all-time leading scorer and guiding his team to a Division II state semifinals appearance as a senior in 2013. He was also named Ohio Player of the Year after averaging 24 points, 3 rebounds, and 4 assists in his final high school season.

College career
Simmons began his college career with Houston, choosing to play for the Cougars over several mid-major programs. He sat out for the 2014–15 season to transfer to Ohio, for whom he had an immediate impact, earning second-team and first-team All-Mid-American Conference (MAC) honors in 2017 and 2018, respectively. As a junior, he averaged 15.5 points and 7.9 assists per game, third in the nation. He transferred to Michigan for his senior campaign because he wanted to reach the NCAA Tournament. However, he received little playing time throughout the season with the national runner-up 2017–18 team playing as a backup point guard to Zavier Simpson.

Professional career
On June 25, 2018, Simmons signed his first professional contract with Union Neuchâtel in Switzerland.

Coaching career 
In 2019, Simmons returned to Michigan to become a graduate manager of the basketball team. He was promoted to the position of video analyst in 2020.

References

External links 
Simmons @ MGoBlue.com
Stats at ESPN
Stats at CBS Sports

1995 births
Living people
American expatriate basketball people in Switzerland
American men's basketball players
Basketball players from Dayton, Ohio
Houston Cougars men's basketball players
Michigan Wolverines men's basketball players
Ohio Bobcats men's basketball players
Point guards
Shooting guards
Union Neuchâtel Basket players